The seventh-order Korteweg–De Vries equation is a nonlinear partial differential equation in 1+1 dimensions related to the KdV equation.

References

Nonlinear partial differential equations